Bakeri may refer to:
 Åpent Bakeri, a bakery where Norwegian cook Morten Schakenda was an apprentice
 Mehdi Bakeri, aIranian hero during the Iran–Iraq War
 Rozita binti Adil Bakeri (born 1973), the child name of the queen of Malaysia
 Saipul Bakeri, finalist in the Malaysian Idol TV program

See also 
 Bakery
 Bakairi (disambiguation)